The 1993 Holy Cross Crusaders football team was an American football team that represented the College of the Holy Cross during the 1993 NCAA Division I-AA football season. Holy Cross finished fourth in the Patriot League.

In their second year under head coach Peter Vaas, the Crusaders compiled a 3–8 record. Todd Araujo, Rob Milanette and Frank Visconti were the team captains.

The Crusaders were outscored 326 to 205 by opponents. Holy Cross' 2–3 conference record placed fourth in the six-team Patriot League standings. It was Holy Cross' first losing season since 1980, and the first time since league play began in 1986 that the Crusaders finished lower than second place.

Holy Cross played its home games at Fitton Field on the college campus in Worcester, Massachusetts.

Schedule

References

Holy Cross
Holy Cross Crusaders football seasons
Holy Cross Crusaders football